Below is a list of mayors (Dutch: burgemeesters) of Amsterdam, capital of the Netherlands. The city had four burgomasters, serving four years. Since 1389 the mayors were elected on 1 February. In the 17th and 18th century, a new mayor was elected by his colleagues (co-option), but his appointment had to be approved by the stadholder. In 1824, it was decided only one person could govern the cities of The Hague and Amsterdam at a time. Mayors of Dutch municipalities are appointed by the municipal council after the acceptance of the King's Commissioner of the province.

14th century
 (1383) – Jacob Coppenszn

15th century
 (1413–1416) – Paul Oosterloo
 (1413,1416) – Franke van der Vorm
 (1413–1414, 1416) – Timan Heyntgen Dircxsz
 (1413, 1416, 1417) – Atienne van Empel
 (1413, 1415) – Sander Oosterom
 (1414) – Hillebrand Vechtersz
 (1414) – Claes Simon Kysersz
 (1415) – Jacob Jan Adamsz
 (1415) – Jonghen Willem Noort
 (1417) – Groote Pieter
 (1417) – IJsebrand de Wisselaer
 (1417–1418) – Willem Gartman
 (1418) – Franck Willem Jansz
 (1418–1419) – Jan Arentsz
 (1418) – Joost Pietersz
 (1419) – Servaes Roeloffz
 (1419) – Daem Braseman
 (1419) – Dirck Rollant
 (1419) – Willem Reynersz
 (1419, 1421–1422, 1425, 1431–1432) – Harman Harmansz
 (1419) – Heyn Willemszn Noirt
 (1420, 1422–1423) – Dirck Hollandt
 (1420–1421) – Jacob Duyvel
 (1420) – Pouwel Luytgensz
 (1420) – Jan Oude Brouck
 (1421) – Jan Woutersz
 (1421, 1424) – Claes Moyert
 (1422, 1424–1425, 1428–1429, 1432, 1435,1437) – Ruysch Jacob Coppensz
 (1422, 1425–1426, 1434, 1437–1438) – Anwel Pietersz
 (1423, 1428) – Moy Reynersz
 (1423, 1430) – Willem Dircxsz
 (1423–1424, 1426–1427, 1429–1430) – Jan Oettensz
 (1424, 1428, 1430–1431, 1434–1435, 1438–1439, 1442–1443) – Hugo Heynensz
 (1425) – Allert Pieter Allertsz
 (1426) – Dirck Bardeusz
 (1426) – Claes Jan Goertsz
 (1427) – Allert Jacob Bijlensz
 (1427) – Jan .. Allertsz
 (1427–1428) – Andries Drericsz
 (1429, 1432) – Groote Dirck Claesz
 (1429, 1435, 1441) – Jong Claes Symon Rijfersz
 (1430) – Symon Colijn
 (1431, 1434) – Claes Jansz
 (1431) – Jonghe Jacob de ..
 (1432–1433, 1435–1436, 1440–1441) – Jan Bout Albertsz
 (1433) – Jan Helmer
 (1433–1434, 1436, 1439–1440, 1442) – Gijsbert Jacob Grebbersz
 (1433, 1436, 1440, 1443, 1446) Jan Claes Symon Hoedincxz
 (1436–1437) – Clement Claesz
 (1437, 1439, 1441, 1442, 1445, 1448) – Pauwels Albertsz
 (1438) – Jan Heynenz
 (1438) – Jan Bedure
 (1439,1445) – Jacob Braseman
 (1440) – Jan Beth Willemsz
 (1441) – Ruysch Jacobsz
 (1442) – Allert Symonsz
 (1443) – Jacob Eybens
 (1443–1444) – Hendrik Anwelsz
 (1444) – Johannes Grebber
 (1444–1445) – Bellert Bechtersz
 (1444–1445, 1447) – Grebber Dircxz
 (1445) – Claes Tijoll
 (1445) – Ruysch Pietersz
 (1445) – Gerrit Groote Pietersz
 (1445–1446, 1452, 1454–1455, 1457, 1459–1460, 1462, 1464–1465, 1467) – Bartholomeus Doos
 (1446, 1448) – Jacob Eyhens
 (1446–1447) – Jan Deyman
 (1447, 1453–1454, 1457) – Dirck Boelensz (−1459)
 (1447–1448, 1452–1453, 1455, 1456) – Hendrik Dirckszn Stuyver (−1456)
 (1448–1449) – Melis Andriesz
 (1449) – Bartholomeus Pieter Reyniersz
 (1449–1450) – Hendrik Anwelsz
 (1449) – Roefrhe Jan Oetensz
 (1450) – Jacob Ropnersz
 (1450, 1464) – Gijsbert Claesz
 (1450, 1453) – Frederick IJsbrandtsz Baers
 (1451) – Jacob Reynersz
 (1451–1452) – Jacob Peekstock
 (1451, 1456) – Grebber Diricxz
 (1451) – Vechter Hillebrantsz
 (1452) – Hendrick Pouwel (−1452)
 (1452) – Jan Wouter Oetenz
 (1453) – Gijsen Jansz (uit Loosdrecht)
 (1454) – Pieter Claesz van Neck
 (1454, 1457–1458, 1462–1463, 1465–1466) – Jan Allertsz
 (1455) – Melis Schout Heynensz
 (1455, 1458–1459,1461) – Gerrit Dirck Smitsz
 (1456) – Copper Vechtersz
 (1456, 1459, 1464) – Jacob Pilien Allertsz
 (1456–1457) – Pieter Dirck Smitsz
 (1458, 1460,1463) – Pieter Allertsz Pietersz
 (1458) – Rombout Andriesz
 (1459, 1461–1462, 1465, 1468–1469, 1471–1472, 1474–1475, 1477, 1481–1482, 1486–1487) – Jacob Jacobsz de Jonge
 (1460) – Claes Melisz van Hoorn
 (1460–1461) – Coman Jan Tymansz
 (1461) – Heyman Ruysschenz
 (1462, 1465, 1468) – Gerrit Matheusz
 (1463, 1467) – Heyman van IJlp Pietersz
 (1463–1464, 1466–1467, 1476, 1478, 1480) – Gerret Dircksz Smit
 (1466, 1474, 1485) – Pieter Elertsz
 (1466, 1472) – Coman Andries Willemsz
 (1467–1468) – Gijsbert Dircxsz Muys
 (1468) – Jacob Ruysch
 (1469–1470, 1472–1473, 1475–1476, 1479–1480, 1482) – Pieter Roding Pietersz
 (1469) – Claes Stansen
 (1469) – Goossen Dirck Bardens
 (1470, 1472, 1475, 1478) – Boel Dirck Boelens (−1482)
 (1470–1471) – Jacob Hendrik Anvelsz
 (1470, 1474) – Louwerens Pouwelsz
 (1470, 1473, 1477–1478, 1480–1481, 1484, 1487) – Jan Beth Jansz
 (1470) – Wouter Oom
 (1473–1474) – Claes Stanssen
 (1473–1476, 1480, 1485, 1488, 1491) Jan Dircksz van Wormer
 (1475, 1479) – Symon Dircsz uit die Poorte
 (1476–1477) – Jan Talingh Jansz
 (1477) – Pieter Allert Pietersz
 (1478–1479) – Gerrit Deyman
 (1479, 1481, 1490–1491) – Jan Cleas van Hoppen
 (1481) – Jan Coman Jansz
 (1481) – Jacob Pieter Hillebrantsz (−1481)
 (1482, 1485–1486, 1488–1489, 1495) – Gijsbert Jacobsz Drooch
 (1482–1483, 1497) – Jacob van Breghe Pietersz
 (1483) – Pieter Haring Jansz
 (1483) – Egbert Jansz
 (1483–1484, 1489, 1502, 1505, 1507, 1509) – Dirck Heymansz Ruysch (−1509)
 (1484, 1491, 1494, 1499–1500) – Dirck Symon Bardenz
 (1484–1485, 1488, 1490, 1492, 1500, 1502) – Bartholomeus Jacobsz
 (1486, 1493) – Jacob van Berghe
 (1486) – Jan Claes Lambertsz
 (1487, 1493) – Jan Broeck Melijsz
 (1487–1488, 1490) – Gerrit Symon Claes Anwelfs
 (1489) – Vechter Barentsz
 (1489, 1490, 1492–1493) – Jacob Jong Jacobsz
 (1491–1492, 1495–1496, 1507) – Dirck Claesz
 (1492) – Jacob Willemszn van Beverwaarde
 (1493–1494, 1498–1499) – Dirck Heymansz
 (1494,1496) – Jan Bethz
 (1494–1495, 1497–1498, 1500–1502) – Willem Andriesz
 (1495, 1497) – Boel Jacobszn Bicker (−1505)
 (1496–1497, 1499, 1501–1502, 1504–1505, 1507–1510, 1512, 1514–1515, 1517) – Andries Boelens (1455–1519)
 (1496, 1498) – Willem Boem

16th century
 (1498) – Bruyninck Claesz
 (1499,1501, 1509, 1511, 1513, 1519) Clement Wolfertsz
 (1500, 1504, 1506, 1509, 1511, 1514) – Dirck Claesz Sillemoer
 (1496–1497, 1499, 1501–1502, 1504–1505, 1507–1510, 1512, 1514–1515, 1517) – Andries Boelens Dircksz. (1455–1519)
 (1502) – Jacob van Bergen Pietersz
 (1502–1503) – Jan Persijn Jansz
 (1503) – Jacob van Burgh
 (1503, 1510, 1512, 1515, 1519) – Corenelis Jansz de Vlaming (−1519)
 (1504, 1506, 1508–1509, 1511–1512, 1514, 1517–1518, 1520–1521, 1523–1524) – Claes Heyn Claesz (−1524)
 (1504, 1506, 1508) – Claes Moyert Dircxz
 (1505–1506, 1508–1509) – Gerrit Mattheusz (−1509)
 (1505, 1507, 1510–1511, 1513–1514, 1516–1517, 1519, 1522–1523, 1525–1526) – Floris Jan Claesz
 (1510, 1512–1513, 1515–1516, 1518, 1520, 1522, 1528, 1536–1537, 1539) – Claes Gerritsz Dayman
 (1513, 1515, 1518, 1523–1524, 1526, 1528–1529, 1531–1532, 1534–1535) – Ruysch Jan Beth
 (1516, 1521) – Willem Duyn Pietersz
 (1516, 1518–1519, 1521–1522, 1524, 1526) – Jonghen Dirck Claesz
 (1517, 1519, 1520) – Jan Lambert Jansz
 (1520) – Simon Claesz Sillemoer
 (1521, 1527, 1529–1530) – Hillebrant Jansz Otter
 (1520–1525, 1527–1528, 1530–1531, 1533–1534, 1537) – Albert Andries Boelensz
 (1523, 1525) – Robert Jacobsz
 (1524) – Symon Claesz van Doorn
 (1525, 1527) – Frans Claes Heynenszn
 (1526, 1527,1529) – Lucas Jacobsz Persijn(−1530)
 (1528, 1530, 1532–1533, 1535) – Hayman Jacobs
 (1529, 1531, 1533) – Cornelis Hendriks Loen
 (1530, 1532, 1537–1538, 1540, 1541) Gerrit Andriesz
 (1531, 1533, 1535) – Peter Colijn (−10 May 1535)
 (1532, 1534, 1542) – Jacob Pietersz Haring
 (1534, 1536) – Cornelis Benning
 (1535–1536, 1538, 1541) – Jan Teng (−1541)
 (1535) – Goossen Jansz Reecalff
 (1536) – Cornelis Buyck Sybrantsz
 (1537, 1542) – Claes Hillebrantsz
 (1538–1539, 1541, 1543, 1545) – Claes Loen Fransz
 (1538, 1540–1541, 1543, 1546–1547, 1550–1551, 1554–1555, 1557, 1558) – Claes Gerrit Mattheusz (−1558)
 (1539–1540, 1542–1543, 1545–1546, 1548, 1549, 1551–1552, 1555–1556, 1564) – Hendrick Dircxs
 (1539, 1541–1542, 1544, 1546, 1548, 1553, 1558) – Claes Doedensz
 (1540, 1549, 1554) – Egbert Garbrantsz
 (1543–1544, 1547, 1549, 1551) – Cleas Heyn Willemsz
 (1544–1545, 1547–1548, 1550, 1552–1553, 1555, 1557, 1559–1560, 1562–1563, 1565) – Pieter Cantert Willemsz
 (1544, 1546, 1548, 1550, 1553) – Claes Hendriksz Basgen (1488–1563)
 (1545, 1547, 1551, 1556–1559, 1561, 1566, 1574) – Dirck Hillebrantsz Otter
 (1549–1550, 1552, 1554, 1556, 1559, 1561, 1565, 1567, 1569–1570, 1572, 1574–1577) – Joost Sijbrantsz Buyck (1505–1588)
 (1552, 1560, 1568) – Symon Mertensz
 (1553–1554, 1559) – Cornelis Dobbensz (−1559)
 (1555, 1557–1558) – Jan Duyvensz
 (1556, 1558, 1560, 1562–1563) – Sybrant Pompeius Occo
 (1559, 1561–1565, 1567–1568, 1570–1571, 1573–1574) – Symon Claes Copsz
 (1560–1561, 1564, 1566–1567, 1569, 1571–1572) – Jan Claes van Hoppen
 (1562–1563, 1566, 1571, 1573, 1575) Cornelis Jacobsz Brouwer
 (1565–1566, 1568, 1569, 1573) – Elbert Marcus
 (1567, 1571) – Hendrick Cornelisz
 (1568, 1570, 1572) – Floris Mertensz
 (1569) – Dirck Jan Dayman
 (1570, 1572, 1573) – Jacob Cornelisz
 (1574, 1576) – Pieter Pietersz
 (1575) – Cornelis Jacobsz van Leyden
 (1575–1576) – Jan Vechtersz
 (1576, 1578) – Jacob Theus Gerrijtsz
 (1577–1578) – Cornelis Claes Meusz
 (1577) – Jacob Cantert
 (1578) – Hendrik Jacobsz Bicker
 (1578) – Reyner Hendriksz
 (1578–1579, 1581–1582, 1584, 1586, 1589, 1592, 1594, 1597, 1601) MrWillem Bardensz=Wilhelm Baerdesen (1528–1601)
 (1578, 1580) – Maarten Jansz Koster (1520–1592)
 (1578, 1580)	 Adriaan Reiniersz Kromhout
 (1578) – Dirk Jansz. Graeff
 (1579) – Jan Claes Cat.
 (1579–1580, 1582–1583, 1585, 1587) – Egbert Roelofz
 (1579, 1581, 1583–1584, 1586–1587, 1592, 1597, 1602, 1604) – Cornelis Florisz van Teylingen
 (1580–1581, 1583, 1585–1586, 1588–1589, 1591–1592, 1594, 1595) – Reynier Cant(1536–1595)
 (1581) – Reynier van Neck
 (1582, 1584–1585) MrMarten Jansz Coster
 (1582, 1587, 1589, 1593, 1596, 1599, 1600) – Jan Claes in Hamburch
 (1583, 1585, 1587–1588, 1590–1591, 1593–1594, 1597–1598, 1600, 1602–1603, 1605–1606, 1608) – Pieter Cornelisz Boom
 (1584) – Jan Verburch
 (1586, 1588, 1590, 1592) – Claes Fransz Oetgens
 (1588, 1591, 1594, 1596–1597, 1601–1602, 1604–1605, 1607–1608, 1610) – Cornelis Pieters Hooft (1547–1626)
 (1589–1590, 1593) – Cornelis Florisz
 (1590, 1593, 1595, 1599–1600) – Balthazar Appelman
 (1591, 1595–1596, 1600–1601, 1603, 1605, 1613–1614, 1616, 1618, 1621, 1623) – Barthold Adriaensz Cromhout
 (1595, 1598–1599, 1606–1607, 1609–1610, 1612, 1614) – Jacob Andriesz Boelens
 (1596, 1598, 1601, 1603–1604, 1606) Jan de Dzn Egbertsz
 (1598, 1599, 1604, 1607, 1611–1612) Frans Hendricxsz Oetgens

17th century
 (1601, 1607, 1610, 1611, 1613) – Cornelis Benning
 (1602, 1608–1609) – Claes Fransz
 (1603)        – Gerrit Pietersz Bicker (1554–1604)
 (1606, 1608)  – Sebastiaen Egberts (1563-)
 (1610)        – Dirck Bas (1569–1637)
 (1605, 1609, 1611, 1614, 1616, 1617, 1619 and 1620) – Reynier Pauw
 (1611, 1614)  – Roelof Egbertsz
 (1612)        – Jan Pietersz Reael
 (1609, 1612–1613 Gerrit Jacobsz Witsen
 (1613–1637) – Jacob de Graeff Dircksz. (1570–1638)
 (???? – ????) – Jacob Poppen (1576–1624)
 (1626–1647) – Jan Cornelisz. Geelvinck (1579–1651)
 (1627–1633) – Geurt van Beuningen
 (???? – ????) – Jan Six (1618–1700)
 (???? – ????) – Hendrik Trip
 (???? – ????) – Hendrik Hooft
 (1627–1649) – Andries Bicker (1586–1652)
 (1638–1646) – Albert C. Burgh (1593–1647)
 (1639–1649) – Gerbrand Claesz Pancras (1591–1649)
 (1650 – ????) – Frans Banning Cocq
 (1646–1650, 1654) – Cornelis Bicker (1593–1654)
 (1653)        – Jan Bicker (1591–1653)
 (1653–1654) – Cornelis Jan Witsen (1605–1669)
 (1654 – ????) – Nicolaes Tulp (1593–1674)
 (1643–1664) – Cornelis de Graeff (1599–1664)
 (???? – ????) – Willem Cornelisz Bakker (1595–1652)
 (???? – ????) – Gerard Schaep (1598–1666)
 (???? – ????) – Gerrit Dedel
 (1657–1671) – Andries de Graeff (1611–1678)
 (???? – ????) – Joan Huydecoper I (1599–1661)
 (???? – ????) – Joan Huydecoper II (1625–1704)
 (???? – ????) – David de Wildt
 (1665, 1666, 1668, 1670, 1673, 1674, 1676, 1678, 1679) – Gillis Valckenier (1666–1727)
 (1667, 1668, 1672) – Lambert Reynst (1613–1679)
 (1669–1686) – Coenraad van Beuningen (1622–1693)
 (1673–1689) – Cornelis Geelvinck (1621–1689)

18th century
 (1672–1704) – Joannes Hudde (1628–1704)
 (1682–1705) – Nicolaas Witsen (1641–1717)
 (1695) – Jacob Jacobsz Hinlopen
 (1695) – Jan Corver
 (1695) – Nicolaas Opmeer
 (1696) – Jacob Boreel
 (1697 – ????) – François de Vicq (1646–1707)
 (1702) – Dirk Bas
 (1702) – Gerbrand Pancras
 (1708, 1711, 1714, 1716–1717) – Gerrit Hooft (1649–1717)
 (1718, 1730) – Jan van de Poll(1) (1666–1735)
 (???? – ????) – Jan van de Poll(2) (1597–1678)
 (???? – ????) – Jan van de Poll(3) (1668–1745)
 (???? – ????) – Egidius van der Bempden (1667–1737)
 (???? – ????) – Hendrikus Bicker (1682–1738)
 (???? – ????) – Cornelis Hop (1685–1762)
 (???? – ????) – Willem Munter (1682–1759)
 (1720, 1743) – Lieve Geelvinck (1676–1743)
 Nicolaes Sautijn(−1743)
 (1748) – Nicolaes Geelvinck
 (1722–1736) – Mattheus Lestevenon (1674–1743)
 (1737, 1740, 1743) – Gerrit Hooft II (1684–1767)
 (1740) – Gerrit Corver
 (???? – 1748) – Gillis van den Bempden
 (1745) – Harmen Hendrik van de Poll (1697–1772)
 (???? – ????) – Pieter Rendorp (1703–1760)
 (1753, 1756, 1759, 1762) – Cornelis Hop (1685–1762)
 (???? – ????) – Quirijn Willem van Hoorn (1730–1797)
 (???? – 1787) – Hendrik Daniëlsz Hooft (1716–1794)
 (???? – ????) – Jacob Elias Arnoudsz (1728–1800)
 (1781–1792) – Joachim Rendorp (1728–1792)
 (???? – 1787, 1793)	  Frederick Alewijn
 (1793 – Nicolaas Faas
 (1793) – Jacob Elias Arnoudsz (1728–1800)
 (1793) – Willem Gerrit Dedel Salomonsz (1734–?)

19th century
1811–1813: Willem Joseph van Brienen van de Groote Lindt (1760–1839)
1813–1824: Pieter Alexander van Boetzelaer (1759–1826)
1813–1824: Jan Brouwer Joachimsz
1813–1816: Paul Ivan Hogguer (1760–1816)
1813–1824: David Willem Elias (1758–1828)
1816–1824: Gerrit Blaauw
1821–1824: Adries Adolph Deutz van Assendelft (1764–1833)
1824–1828: David Willem Elias (1758–1828)
1828–1836: Frederik van de Poll (1780–1853)
1836–1842: Willem Daniël Cramer (1788–1856)
1842–1849: Pieter Huidekoper (1798–1852)
1850–1853: Gerlach Cornelis Joannes van Reenen (1818–1893)
1853–1853: Hendrik Provó Kluit (1803–1860)
1854: no mayor
1855–1858: Cornelis Hendrik Boudewijn Boot (1813–1892)
1858–1866: Jan Messchert van Vollenhoven (1812–1881)
1866–1868: Cornelis Fock (1828–1910)
1868–1880: Cornelis den Tex (1824–1882)
1880–1891: Gijsbert van Tienhoven (1841–1914)
1891–1901: Sjoerd Anne Vening Meinesz (1833–1909)

Early 20th century
1901–1910: Wilhelmus Frederik van Leeuwen (1860–1930)
1910–1915: Antonie baron Roëll (1864–1940)
1915–1921: Jan Willem Cornelis Tellegen (1859–1921)
1921–1941: Willem de Vlugt (1872–1945)
1941–1945: Edward John Voûte (1887–1950)
1945–1946: Feike de Boer (1892–1976)
1946–1957: Arnold Jan d'Ailly (1902–1967)

List of mayors of Amsterdam since 1957

See also
 Namen van de regeerders der stad Amsterdam, Volume 1

References

Amsterdam
 
Government of Amsterdam
History of Amsterdam
Mayors